Donald James Thompson MBE (20 January 1933 – 3 October 2006) was an English racewalker.  He was the only British man to win a gold medal at the 1960 Summer Olympics, in the 50 km walk.  He also won a bronze medal at the 1962 European Championships, also for the 50 km walk.

Thompson was born in Hillingdon, London and taught maths at Southland's comprehensive school, New Romney, from the mid 1970s.  A small man, only 5'5" tall, he was originally a runner, but an injury to his Achilles' tendon forced him to take up race walking instead.  He came second in the 52½ miles London to Brighton road race in 1954, and then won the event in each of the following eight years. He raced in the 50 km walk in the 1956 Summer Olympics in Melbourne, Australia, but withdrew dehydrated after 45 km while in fifth place.

He practised to compete at the Olympic Games in Rome in 1960 by exercising in a steam-filled bathroom at home, with the heating turned up and wearing a heavy tracksuit.  After exercising for about half an hour, he would feel faint.  At the time, he attributed his light-headedness to the effects of heat and humidity, but later realised that it was carbon monoxide fumes from the paraffin heater.  His mother made him a hat like a képi to keep the sun off his head and neck during the race; together with his sunglasses, he was nicknamed "Il Topolino" (Italian: "Mickey Mouse", literally "little mouse").  In the 50 km race, staged at temperatures of up to 87 °F, the front two competitors were disqualified, and Thompson beat John Ljunggren of Sweden by 17 seconds to win the gold medal in 4 hours 25 minutes 30 seconds. The only other British competitor to win a gold medal at the 1960 Summer Olympics was Anita Lonsbrough, in the 200 m breaststroke. He was voted Sportsman of the Year in 1960 by the Sports Writers' Association.

He won a bronze medal at the European Championships in 1962, and was tenth at the 1964 Summer Olympics, both in the 50 km walk.  He continued racing for another 40 years, until the early 1990s and completing more than 150 marathons and a 100 mile racewalk in 1978. He habitually woke at 4am to run 8 miles each morning.  In 1983, he fell and broke his collarbone during a marathon walk in Thanet; undeterred, he completed the race before seeking treatment.  He represented Britain in a race in France in 1991, aged 58 years and 89 days, becoming the oldest person to represent Britain in an international athletics event.

Outside athletics, he worked as an insurance clerk, a gardener and as a teacher (at Southland's School, New Romney). He was appointed a Member of the Most Excellent Order of the British Empire (MBE) in the 1970 New Year Honours for services to athletics.  He collapsed at home and died at Frimley Park Hospital after suffering a brain aneurysm.  He married in 1967, and was survived by his wife, and their son and daughter.

References

External links

racewalkingrecord.com, 5 October 2006
Olympic 50km walking champion Thompson dies, The Guardian, 6 October 2006
Obituary, The Times, 10 October 2006
Obituary, The Scotsman, 11 October 2006
Obituary, Sports Journalists' Association News, 6 October 2006 
Obituary, The Guardian, 24 October 2006
Fond Memories of Don Thompson, Track Stats, November 2009

1933 births
2006 deaths
People from Hillingdon
English male racewalkers
British male racewalkers
Olympic athletes of Great Britain
Olympic gold medallists for Great Britain
Athletes (track and field) at the 1956 Summer Olympics
Athletes (track and field) at the 1960 Summer Olympics
Athletes (track and field) at the 1964 Summer Olympics
English Olympic medallists
Athletes (track and field) at the 1966 British Empire and Commonwealth Games
Deaths from intracranial aneurysm
Medalists at the 1960 Summer Olympics
European Athletics Championships medalists
Olympic gold medalists in athletics (track and field)
Commonwealth Games competitors for England
Members of the Order of the British Empire